Statistics of Scottish Football League in season 1979/1980.

Scottish Premier Division

Scottish First Division

Scottish Second Division

See also
1979–80 in Scottish football

References

 
Scottish Football League seasons